Ashley Christina Hartman (born August 31, 1985) is an American actress, singer, and television presenter.

Biography

Early life
Hartman was born to Michele Knutsen and Kip Hartman in Orange County, California. When she was four years of age, her parents divorced and Hartman lived with Knutsen and her two sisters. Maria Carmel, Ashley's older sister, is a fashion photographer and won the 2007 Vh1 reality show "The Shot."

Before  American Idol, she was the church cantor at her private elementary school, St. John the Baptist in Costa Mesa, California. She attended Mater Dei High School in Santa Ana, California, for her freshman, sophomore, and junior years but graduated elsewhere.

Music career
In 2003, Hartman went to Hollywood in order to participate in American Idol and made it into the top 32 finalists. After her performance of Diana Ross's "Touch Me in The Morning," the judges suggested she get into acting and modeling.

Acting career

Television
She was soon recruited by the casting director of the FOX series The O.C.. Hartman had a six-episode recurring role as Holly Fischer in the first season of The O.C., and returned in the fourth season for 4 episodes. In addition to her role in The O.C., Hartman landed a role in the horror film Abominable.  Hartman is currently the face of CBS Mobile, TV.com, and is the host of MTV's "Kiss & Tell: The Do's and Don'ts of Dating."

Filmography 
 Abominable (2006)

Television
 The O.C. (2003–2007)
 Quintuplets (2004)
 Danny Bonaduce Life Coach (2008)

Host
 "American Idol" (2003)
 "101 Reasons the 90's Ruled" (2004)
 "CMT 20 Sexiest Men" (2004)
 "CMT: 20 Sexiest Women" (2004)
 "The O.C.: A Day in the Life" (2004)
 "The O.C.: Obsess Completely" (2004)
 "Poorman's Bikini Beach" (2005)
 "CMT: The Greatest – 20 Sexiest Men" (2006)
 "CMT: The Greatest – 20 Sexiest Women" (2006)
 "The 51st Annual Grammy Style Studio" (2008)
 "Victoria Secret TV" (2008)
 "The Grammy's Style Studio" (2009–2010)

Notes

External links

1985 births
Living people
Actors from Orange County, California
American Idol participants
American film actresses
American television actresses
Female models from California
21st-century American women singers
21st-century American singers